Johan en de Alverman (Johan and the Alverman) was a Flemish children's TV series, broadcast on the BRT (now the VRT) between 1965 and 1966.

Together with Captain Zeppos, it is considered to be one of the classics of Flemish children's television. It was very popular and has been repeated many times. It was also a huge success in Italy, Germany, the Netherlands, Sweden and Norway.

Concept
The story is set in 1650. A local surgeon, Johan Claeszoons, meets a strange dwarf in the forest who is unable to speak his language. He shares some food with him and the dwarf becomes his friend. He turns out to be an alverman, who was banned from the kingdom of Avalon because he was too curious. He is only allowed to return to his people when he can bring something of use to the entire people of Avalon. His magic flute and his magic ring, Fafiforniek, aid him.

Later in the story, Johan meets Rosita, the beautiful daughter of Don Cristobal de Bobadilla, with whom he falls in love, but he has to face the menace of her suitor, the evil Guy de Sénancourt as well as Cristobal, who sends his Native American servant Otorongo after him.

Cast
 Johan Claeszoon: Frank Aendenboom
 De Alverman: Jef Cassiers
 Don Cristobal de Bobadilla: Cyriel Van Gent
 Rosita de Bobadilla: Rosemarie Bergmans
 Otorongo: Dolf De Winter
 Guy de Sénancourt: Alex Cassiers
 Oom Willem: Ward De Ravet
 Tante Liezelotje: Fanny Winkler
 Ome Ben: Vic Moeremans
 Cipolla: Walter Moeremans
 Pietro: Jos Mahu
 Simone: Chris Lomme
 De Baljuw: Marcel Hendrickx
 Farmer Janus: Jan Reussens
 Marquis: Roger Bolders
 Knight servant: Raymond Bossaerts
 Alberic van Avalon: Robert Maes
 Elf: Marilou Mermans
 Royal servant: Jacky Morel
 'Guard: Jaak Van Hombeek

Background
Originally, Luc Phillips was to play the Alverman, but he had other commitments, so Jef Cassiers replaced him.

The actors Aendenboom and Bergmans became a couple in real life during the recordings.

The show was recorded in several historical or nature resorts in Belgium, including in Gaasbeek, the Caves of Han-sur-Lesse, Brussels, Orp-Jauche and Bokrijk.

The story was also adapted into a series of novels.

The theme music, "The Duchess of Brighton" was taken from the film The V.I.P.s (1962) and composed by Miklós Rózsa.

The success of Johan en de Alverman inspired the Dutch children's TV series Floris, which is also a costume drama.

Sources

External links
 https://www.imdb.com/title/tt0231826/

Flemish television shows
Belgian children's television shows
Belgian fantasy television series
1965 Belgian television series debuts
1966 Belgian television series endings
Television shows adapted into novels
Black-and-white Belgian television shows
Television shows set in Belgium
Fiction set in the 1650s
Television series set in the 17th century
Television about magic
Television about fairies and sprites
Native Americans in popular culture
Fictional gnomes
Television shows based on fairy tales
Dutch-language television shows
Television characters introduced in 1965
Eén original programming